Dr. Luis María Argaña International Airport  is an airport that serves the small city of Mariscal Estigarribia, in the Boquerón Department of Paraguay.

The airport is named after Luis María Argaña, a vice president who was assassinated in 1999. It is operated by Paraguayan military authorities. GlobalSecurity.org states that some believe the United States are using the airport as a permanent military base. However, they go on to say that this is false.

With 3,500 m (11,483 ft), its runway is the longest in the country, more than Asunción's airport.

See also

 List of airports in Paraguay
 Transport in Paraguay

References

External links
 Direccion Nacional de Aeronautica Civil - Airports of Paraguay

Airports in Paraguay
Boquerón Department